Mescinia estrella is a species of snout moth in the genus Mescinia. It was described by William Barnes and James Halliday McDunnough in 1913, and is known from the Everglades in Florida, United States.

References

Moths described in 1913
Phycitinae